Pù Luông Nature Reserve is a nature reserve in northern Vietnam. This nature reserve is situated in Quan Hóa and Bá Thước districts of Thanh Hóa Province, North Central Coast region of Vietnam. Pu Luong Nature Reserve is bordered by Mai Châu, Tân Lạc and Lạc Sơn districts of Hòa Bình Province. The reserve is located along two parallel mountain ridges, that run from north-west to south-east, and are divided by a central valley, which contains several human settlements and a large agricultural land area, therefore, is not included within the nature reserve. Pù Luông is endowed with great biodiversity, its flora and fauna is closely associated with the Cúc Phương National Park 25 km south-east.

Pu Luong is a natural reservation in northern land of Vietnam. It is 160 km away from Hanoi and takes 4-hour driving to south-west of Hanoi. 

Nature conservation in Vietnam
Nature reserves in Vietnam
Geography of Thanh Hóa province